Pęgów may refer to the following places in Poland:
Pęgów, Lower Silesian Voivodeship (south-west Poland)
Pęgów, Łódź Voivodeship (central Poland)